{{Taxobox
| name = Pasteurella mairii
| domain = Bacteria
| phylum = Pseudomonadota
| classis = Gammaproteobacteria
| ordo = Pasteurellales
| familia = Pasteurellaceae
| genus = Pasteurella| species = P. mairii| binomial = Pasteurella mairii| binomial_authority = Sneath and Stevens 1990 
}}Pasteurella mairii'' is a Gram-negative bacterium. It causes abortion in sows.

References

Further reading

External links

LPSN
Type strain of Pasteurella mairii at BacDive -  the Bacterial Diversity Metadatabase

Pasteurellales